The 22nd Legislative Assembly of Saskatchewan was elected in the 1991 Saskatchewan election. It was controlled by the New Democratic Party under Premier Roy Romanow. With 66 representatives elected, the 22nd Assembly had the largest number of MLAs in Saskatchewan history.

In the fall of 1992 former premier Grant Devine resigned as leader of the opposition Progressive Conservative party. Richard Swenson temporarily led the PC caucus from 1992 to 1994, then was succeeded by Bill Boyd for the remaining year of the 22nd Assembly.

Members elected
Names in bold represent party leaders and the Speaker.

See also
 List of Saskatchewan provincial electoral districts

References
 The list from the official Legislature website
 Saskatchewan Archives Board - Election Results By Electoral Division

Terms of the Saskatchewan Legislature